Communist Party of India (Marxist-Leninist) MUC (Maoist Unity Centre) is the merged entity of two naxal-factions - Maharashtra Communist Party and Kerala Communist Party, which in turn is the splinter factions of Central Reorganisation Committee, Communist Party of India (Marxist–Leninist).

History
In 1991, Central Reorganisation Committee, Communist Party of India (Marxist–Leninist) leader K. Venu decided to denounce of the Naxalism and disband the party. He renounced Maoism and declared an All India communist party as an impossibility. Groups dissatisfied with the dissolution formed the Maharashtra Communist Party and Kerala Communist Party.

Merger with Communist Party of India (Marxist-Leninist) Naxalbari
After some years, Communist Party of India (Marxist-Leninist) MUC merged with Communist Party of India (Marxist-Leninist) Naxalbari.

Political parties in India
Naxalite–Maoist insurgency